Imaoka (written 今岡) is a Japanese surname. Notable people with the surname include:

, Japanese basketball player
, Japanese film director, screenwriter and actor

Japanese-language surnames